The Very Best of Carly Simon: Nobody Does It Better is the third greatest hits album by American singer-songwriter Carly Simon, released on December 15, 1998. 

Originally released in the UK, this was Simon's first single-disc, cross label compilation. It includes her hits from the Elektra years (1971–1979) and the Arista years (1986–2000). The album also includes the 1982 single "Why", a top 10 hit in the UK, from the Soup For One soundtrack.

Reception

AllMusic rated the collection 4-stars-out-of-5, and wrote while "some consumers may be a little ticked at the non-chronological sequencing, this collection does have one big, big virtue -- it has Carly Simon's big hits, not just from the '70s, but such latter-day comebacks as "Coming Around Again" and "Let the River Run", on one disc. That makes it worth import prices for non-U.K. residents looking for a thorough collection."

Track listing
Credits adapted from the album's liner notes.

Notes
 signifies a writer by additional lyrics

Credits

Charts
Album – International

References

External links
 Carly Simon's Official Website

1999 greatest hits albums
Carly Simon compilation albums
Warner Records compilation albums
Albums produced by Paul Samwell-Smith
Albums produced by Richard Perry
Albums recorded at MSR Studios
Albums recorded at Morgan Sound Studios
Albums recorded at A&M Studios
Albums recorded at Sunset Sound Recorders
Albums recorded at Trident Studios
Albums recorded at Electric Lady Studios
Albums arranged by Paul Buckmaster